The Aviatik B.I is a German two-seat reconnaissance biplane designed and built by the Automobil und Aviatik AG company, who until then had produced copies of French designs.

Design and development
The first of indigenous Aviatik biplanes, designed by Robert Wild, was the P.13, flown in April–May 1912. The type was widely used in competitions and gained high reputation. An improved design was the P.14 of 1913, with smaller 2½-bay wings and aerodynamic and structural refinements. Also in 1913, an ultimate refined design P.15 was built, with 2-bay or 3-bay wings and a fail fin.

The German air force got interested in Aviatik aircraft and ordered 101 P.13 and P.14s in 1913, then further orders followed. The crew sat in open tandem cockpits with the observer in the front. Initially they were designated just as Aviatik B, with a service number and two last digits of a year (e.g. B.268/13). From September 1915 the aircraft P.15 type were designated as B.I (P.15b with 100 hp engine) or B.II (P.15a with 120 hp engine). There is a supposition, that earlier B-class 100 hp Aviatiks might have been designated B.I as well. Aviatik B-class were unarmed, but in a course of the war, machine guns were sometimes used.

The B.I was manufactured in large numbers in Italy under licence by Società Aeronautica Meccanica Lombardia (SAML), which built 410 examples according to Aviatik's design. The firm then put two modified versions of their own into production, as designed by Robert Wild. The first of these, the SAML S.1 was powered by a Fiat A.12 engine and was armed with a Fiat-Revelli machine gun for the observer. The second version, the SAML S.2 was intended for the reconnaissance-bomber role and had a shorter wingspan, a fixed, forward-firing Fiat-Revelli machine gun in addition to the one in the rear cockpit, and a bomb load of 40 kg (90 lb). The 16 Squadriglie da Recognizione operated 660 S-1s and S-2s from 1917 onwards in Italy, Albania, and Macedonia.
Two SAML S.1 participated in the Revolution of 1922 in Paraguay in the government side. They survived the conflict and they were the first planes of the new Military Aviation School, along a single Ansaldo SVA.5, an Ansaldo SVA.10 and a SPAD S.20. One S.1 was destroyed in an accident in 1928 but the other survived as a trainer during the Chaco War.

The Aviatik B.114/14 was the first aircraft shot down with gunfire in aerial combat on October 5, 1914, by French Voisin III.

Variants
P.131912 two-seat reconnaissance biplane, (designated B.I).
P.141913 two-seat reconnaissance biplane, an improved P.13, 101 P.13 and P.14 aircraft ordered, (designated B.I).
P.15two-seat reconnaissance biplane, (designated B.I).
P.15aB.I aircraft with  engine.
P.15bAvaitik B.II (powered by a  engine).
B early deliveries of P.13 and P.14 Aviatiks were designated with B nnn/nn (B serial / year)
B.I From 1915 P.15a with  engines.
B.II From 1915 P.15b with  engines.
SAML S.1 410 B.I aircraft built by Società Aeronautica Meccanica Lombardia (SAML) in Italy.

Operators

KuKLFT

Luftstreitkrafte

Corpo Aeronautico Militare

Paraguayan Air Force

Turkish Air Force - Postwar, SAML Aviatik B.I .

Specifications (P.15a B.I)

See also

Notes

Bibliography
 Angelucci, Enzo. The Rand McNally Encyclopedia of Military Aircraft, 1914-1980. San Diego, California: The Military Press, 1983. .
 Gunston, Bill. World Encyclopedia of Aircraft Manufacturers. Annapolis: Naval Institute Press, 1993. 1-55750-939-5.
 Jackson, Robert. The Encyclopedia of Military Aircraft. London: Paragon, 2002. .

 Taylor, Michael J. H. Jane's Encyclopedia of Aviation. London: Studio Editions, 1989. .
 Grosz, Peter M. Aviatik B-types. Berkhamsted: Albatros Productions, 2003. Windsock Datafile No.102. .

External links

 Century of Flight Aviatik B.I

Military aircraft of World War I
1910s German military reconnaissance aircraft
B.I
Biplanes
Single-engined tractor aircraft
Aircraft first flown in 1914